The 2017 Belarusian First League was the 27th season of 2nd level football in Belarus. It started in April and finished in November 2017.

Team changes from 2016 season
Two best teams of 2016 Belarusian First League (Gomel and Dnepr Mogilev) were promoted to Belarusian Premier League. They were replaced by two lowest placed teams of 2016 Belarusian Premier League table (Belshina Bobruisk and Granit Mikashevichi).

Oshmyany, who finished 14th last year, relegated to the Second League. Due to First League expansion to 16 teams, they were replaced by three best teams of 2016 Second League (Volna Pinsk, Osipovichi and Kletsk). Kletsk eventually withdrew from participation due to club's lack of financing and infrastructure, and was replaced by Second League 4th placed team Neman-Agro Stolbtsy.

Before the start of the season Gomelzheldortrans changed their name to Lokomotiv Gomel, Slonim to Slonim-2017 and Zvezda-BGU Minsk to Energetik-BGU Minsk.

Teams summary

League table

Results

Top goalscorers

Updated to games played on 11 November 2017 Source: football.by

See also
2017 Belarusian Premier League
2016–17 Belarusian Cup
2017–18 Belarusian Cup

External links
 Official site 

Belarusian First League seasons
2
Belarus
Belarus